Sreten Stojanović (2 February 1898 – 29 October 1960) was a Serbian sculptor and art critic. His artistic individuality was best observed in portraits made of various materials.

Biography
He was born on 15 February 1898 in Prijedor in Bosnia and Herzegovina, in the house of Orthodox priests who "preached the faith for strength of people and who imagined Russia to be something that is ours or more beautiful, bigger, more Orthodox, closer to God and more powerful than anything that was German or Turkish”, as he wrote in his autobiography. He inherited such a patriarchal family's firmness and stability, from people who grew up in that very soil and he spent his whole life being so ingrained, not giving up on the deepest and unchanged moral principles. He belonged to the Young Bosnia Movement where he was, as a juvenile pupil of the Tuzla's high school, sentenced to 10 years in prison. He was also shortly engaged adventurously in national interests at the end of the First World War. In Vienna he studied sculpture and at the beginning of the 1920s he enjoyed a turbulent bohemian life in Paris, where he also devoted himself to study. With Dragiša Vasić and Vladislav Ribnikar he was traveling through the Soviet Union in 1927. After the Second World War he was a dynamic social and cultural activist.

Stojanović became a sculptor after going to study, first in Vienna at the beginning of 1918, and later in Paris. He received his scholarships from Dr. Djurica Djordjević and his wife Krista, who he became acquainted and afterward became friends with. They were big defenders of the modern art in between-the-wars Yugoslavia and their house became one of the most known meeting places of artists, writers, young left-wing politicians and intellectuals. He indulged in Viennese revolutionary movements before the black-yellow monarchy's downfall. Being in the midst of social happenings, he returned to Bosnia immediately after the end of the war where he was engaged in creation of first Yugoslavia, with all his achieved political and penal reputation, belligerence and revolutionary mood. He commanded the committee and irregular troops which established order in a condition of a total anarchy, just before arrival of the regular Alexander the Great's liberation army which was arriving in its epochal Thessaloniki inrush.

In 1919, Stojanović went to Paris to pursue the best studies of art, which not only ensured the necessary education but also close contacts with numerous life's challenges and a creative stimulation coming from one of the biggest European metropolises. One address and information that Serbs gather in the cafés on Boulevard Saint-Michel was enough for him, reported the autobiographer, remembering his first meeting with the art metropolis of those times.

The most vivid depiction of Stojanović and the whole atmosphere dominated in artistic circles and bohemian societies of Paris at the end of the second and beginning of the third decade of the last century was made by L. Trifunović:

"Such a handsome and gallant man, with a shirt-blouse and black officer's frock coat, wearing a Borsalino hat with a wide rim, has entered early the circles of the Montparnasse Bohemians who lived around Rotonda and Cupola cafés, where people were drinking not too much and spending little money, talking, reciting, napping, passing time. One could meet friends here, known and unknown artists, confident Zadkine with a dog, Fougita with his strange hairstyle and his ugly friend, bulky Isidora Duncan, Shanna Orlow, Kisling, crazy Americans and drunken Swedes, Indians, Swiss, Russians... Montparnasse looked like a modern Babylon. His life and youth were abundantly satisfied."

Another critic of Stojanović's artistic opus described the change that took place after his studies and return to the homeland:

"After moving to Belgrade, Sreten's biography lost a sense of a happy story. He seriously and professionally starts creating, establishing his first sculpture studio, exhibits his works at soloist and group exhibitions, very actively participates in the art life, writes artistic criticism, publishes two books, appears in public often and discusses professional or social problems at those times, gives popular lectures about art, grounds a family, travels..."

During the Second World War he lived in Belgrade with his family and when the war was over he found out that his brother, Dr. Mladen Stojanović, died. His brother was a legendary national hero and one of the key persons of Josip Broz Tito's partisan movement in western Bosnia. After his brother's death, Stojanović engaged himself in many functions. He was the chairman of the National Front in Belgrade, commoner, the secretary of the Association of Painters of Yugoslavia, the chairman of the Association of Painters of Serbia, the principal of the Art Academy, the editor of the magazine "Art", a member of Serbian Academy of Art and Sciences in 1950, etc.

He died in Belgrade in 1960, leaving behind one of the most valuable sculpture opuses in the Serbian art of the 20th century. For his birthplace Prijedor he gave a gift of an important part of his artworks. His creations can also be seen in the gallery Pavlo Beljanski in Novi Sad, the National museum and the Museum of modern art in Belgrade. In memorial buildings in Belgrade, Vojvodina, Montenegro and Republic of Srpska in Bosnia-Herzegovina there are some of his most important monumental compositions.

Gallery

Bibliography

See also
 Živojin Lukić
 Petar Palavičini
 Dušan Jovanović Đukin
 Risto Stiljović
 Mihailo Tomić
 Rastko Petrović 
 Prince Bojidar Karageorgevich

References

Revolucionarsko vajarstvo, Spektar, Zagreb, 1977 
Narodna enciklopedija, St. Stanojević, Zagreb, 1925–1929

External links

 SANU biography
Sreten Stojanović biography
Livnica Jeremić biography of Sreten Stojanović
ARTE Biography Sreten Stojanović (1898–1960)
Novo groblje Sreten Stojanović
Jovan Despotović: Sreten Stojanović 1898–1960
Sreten Stojanović

1898 births
1960 deaths
People from Prijedor
Bosnia and Herzegovina sculptors
Serbian sculptors
Male sculptors
Serbs of Bosnia and Herzegovina
20th-century sculptors
20th-century Bosnia and Herzegovina artists
Rectors of the University of Arts in Belgrade